Miss Venezuela 1980 was the 27th Miss Venezuela pageant, was held in Caraballeda, Vargas state, Venezuela, on May 8, 1980, after weeks of events.  The winner of the pageant was Maye Brandt, Miss Lara.

The pageant was broadcast live on Venevision from the Macuto Sheraton Hotel in Caraballeda, Vargas state. At the conclusion of the final night of competition, outgoing titleholder Maritza Sayalero, Miss Venezuela 1979 and Miss Universe 1979, crowned Maye Brandt of Lara as the new Miss Venezuela.

Joaquín Riviera held the post of program producer for the first time at this event, which was the first to be broadcast in color nationwide, just weeks before the official completion of conversion to color broadcasts. Joining Gilberto Correa for that year's broadcast were Carmen Victoria Pérez and Hilda Carrero as co-hosts. 

14 young ladies entered that year's pageant, while 19 had entered the year prior.

Results
Miss Venezuela 1980 - Maye Brandt (Miss Lara)

The runners-up were:
1st runner-up - Hilda Abrahamz (Miss Departamento Vargas)
2nd runner-up - Graciela La Rosa (Miss Amazonas)
3rd runner-up - Lisbeth Fernández (Miss Guárico)
4th runner-up - Julie Fernández (Miss Aragua)

Special awards
 Miss Photogenic (voted by press reporters) - Elizabeth Cocucci (Miss Nueva Esparta)
 Miss Congeniality - Nathalie Sáiz (Miss Falcón)
 Miss Elegance - Dalia Novellino (Miss Barinas)
 Miss Amity - Betsy Ballestrini (Miss Trujillo)

Delegates
The Miss Venezuela 1980 delegates are:

 Miss Amazonas - Graciela La Rosa Guarneri
 Miss Aragua - Julie Fernández Gómez
 Miss Barinas - Dalia Elena Josefina Novellino Blonval 
 Miss Carabobo - Maria Gabriela Bolaños
 Miss Cojedes - Lirio González Jiménez
 Miss Departamento Vargas - Hilda Astrid Abrahamz Navarro
 Miss Distrito Federal - Milagros Alejandra Toledo
 Miss Falcón - Nathalie Sáiz
 Miss Guárico - Lisbeth Fernández Watson
 Miss Lara - Maye Brandt Angulo
 Miss Nueva Esparta - Elizabeth Cocucci Bueno
 Miss Sucre - Kennedy Jackeline Pettine
 Miss Trujillo - Betsy Ballestrini
 Miss Zulia - Soraya Navas Bravo

External links
Miss Venezuela official website

1980 beauty pageants
1980 in Venezuela